Jin Air Green Wings is a South Korean e-sports organization with teams competing in StarCraft II and League of Legends. Its parent organization is Korean Air subsidiary Jin Air. The organization was formed in November 2011 as a StarCraft: Brood War team, which combined three disbanding Proleague teams: Hwaesung Oz, WeMade FOX and MBCGame HERO. It was simply known as "The 8th Team" until Jin Air became its title sponsor in July 2013. Jin Air Green Wings is currently one of eight Korean e-Sports Association recognized teams participating in the Proleague.

League of Legends

Final Roster

History

2013 season 
The Jin Air organization picked up the rosters of Eat Sleep Game and Hoon Good Day to form the Jin Air Green Wings Falcons and the Jin Air Green Wings Stealths respectively. Miso, Reapered, Raven, Roar and StarLast joined the Falcons and HooN, TrAce, ActScene, ŁØAÐ and IceBear joined the Stealths. Neither team managed to qualify for worlds.

2014 season 
A mixed Jin Air team participated at the SK Telecom LTE-A LoL Masters 2014 but they placed fifth in the regular season and missed playoffs. Neither the Stealths nor the Falcons managed to earn enough circuit points to qualify for the 2014 Season Korea Regional Finals so neither went to worlds.

2015 season 
Changes to the OGN rules forced both teams to merge to form the Jin Air Green Wings. The roster consisted of TrAce, Chaser, Winged, GBM, Pilot, Cpt Jack, Chei, and XD. They placed fourth in the regular season of SBENU Champions Spring 2015 and qualified for the playoffs. However, they lost in the first round 3–0 to CJ Entus and placed fourth for the season. Jin Air placed sixth in the regular season of SBENU eChampions Summer 2015 and gained 10 circuit points but missed the playoffs. They had enough circuit points to qualify for the 2015 Season Korea Regional Finals where they made it to the finals but lost 3–1 to KT Rolster and barely missed out on worlds.

GBM was left off of the roster for KeSPA Cup 2015 and ultimately joined NRG eSports. Jin Air played in the 2015 LoL KeSPA Cup where they lost 2–0 in the quarterfinals to CJ Entus.

Jin Air received an invitation to Intel Extreme Masters Season X - San Jose where they ended up finishing 5–8.

2016 season 
In December 2016, Pilot and Blanc joined PSG eSports.

2019 season 
Jin Air Greenwings had experienced a 15-series losing streak in Spring 2019. They broke their losing streak by taking the match from Afreeca Freecs on March 7, 2019, with a set score of 2–1. They ended up at the last place for the season, and had to go through Summer Promotion to play in the LCK. They successfully promoted back to the LCK by winning their last match in the 2019 LCK Summer Promotion with a set score of 3–1 against ES Sharks.

For the Summer season, they went through a 18-series losing streak. They only managed to win 4 games, without winning a single match. They had an overall of 1–35 record of their match in the 2019 season. They went through their second LCK promotion in the same year in order to play in the LCK again. However, they lost in the match against Hanwha Life Esports for the last spot of LCK, and was relegated to Challengers Korea.

2020 season 
Jin Air was announced as one of the short list of alternates for LCK franchising.  On November 17, Jin Air announced that they had not been selected to participate in the LCK Franchised league and their League of Legends team would be disbanding.

StarCraft II 
Jang "Creator" Hyun-woo joined the team on November 17, 2015.

Final Roster

Former players

History 
On Nov 30, 2020, Jin Air officially disbanded their Starcraft 2 team.

References

External links 
 

2011 establishments in South Korea
Esports teams based in South Korea
Korean Air
StarCraft teams
Jin Air Green Wings players
Former League of Legends Champions Korea teams